Dovadola is a comune (municipality) in the Province of Forlì-Cesena in the Italian region Emilia-Romagna, located about  southeast of Bologna and about  southwest of Forlì, on the road leading to Florence.

Dovadola borders the following municipalities: Castrocaro Terme e Terra del Sole, Modigliana, Predappio, Rocca San Casciano.

References

Cities and towns in Emilia-Romagna